Leposternon is a genus of amphisbaenians in the family Amphisbaenidae. Species in the genus are commonly known as worm lizards, even though they are not lizards. 11 species are placed in this genus.

Species
The following species are recognized as being valid.
Leposternon bagual Ribeiro, Santos & Zaher, 2015
Leposternon cerradensis Ribeiro, Vazsilva & Santos, 2008
Leposternon infraorbitale (Berthold, 1859) – Berthold's worm lizard
Leposternon kisteumacheri Porto, Soares & Caramaschi, 2000
Leposternon maximus Ribeiro, Nogueira, Cintra, da Silva & Zaher, 2011
Leposternon microcephalum Wagler, 1824 – smallhead worm lizard
Leposternon mineiro Ribeiro, Lima-Silveira & Santos, 2018
Leposternon octostegum (A.H.A. Duméril, 1851) – Duméril's worm lizard
Leposternon polystegum (A.H.A. Duméril, 1851) – Bahia worm lizard
Leposternon scutigerum (Hemprich), 1820 – shielded worm lizard
Leposternon wuchereri (W. Peters, 1879) – Wucherer's worm lizard

Nota bene: A binomial authority in parentheses indicates that the species was originally described in a genus other than Leposternon.

References

Further reading

Gans C (2005). "Checklist and Bibliography of the Amphisbaenia of the World". Bulletin of the American Museum of Natural History (289): 1-130.
Wagler J (1824). In: Spix J (1824). Serpentum Brasiliensum species novae ou histoire naturelle des espèces nouvelles de serpens, recueillies et observées pendant le voyage dans l'intérieur du Brésil dans les années 1817, 1818, 1819, 1820, exécuté par ordre de sa Majesté le Roi de Baviére. Munich: F.S. Hübschmann. viii + 75 pp. + Plates I-XXVI. (Leposternon, new genus, p. 70). (in Latin and French).

 
Lizard genera
Taxa named by Wilhelm Hemprich